James Wills was an American Negro league catcher in the 1910s.

Wills played for the Minneapolis Keystones in 1910 and 1911. In three recorded games, he posted three hits in 14 plate appearances.

References

External links
Baseball statistics and player information from Baseball-Reference Black Baseball Stats and Seamheads

Year of birth missing
Year of death missing
Place of birth missing
Place of death missing
Minneapolis Keystones players
Baseball catchers